Ilkeston was a Municipal Borough in Derbyshire, England from 1887 to 1974. It was formed under the Municipal Corporations Act 1882.

The borough was abolished in 1974 under the Local Government Act 1972 and combined with the Long Eaton Urban District and part of the South East Derbyshire Rural District to form the new Erewash district.

References

Districts of England abolished by the Local Government Act 1972
History of Derbyshire
Ilkeston
Ilkeston